(Gaeltacht Way, Donegal) comprises four circular long-distance trails in the Gaeltacht areas of County Donegal Republic of Ireland. All four trails are designated as a National Waymarked Trails by the National Trails Office of the Irish Sports Council and managed by Donegal County Council and Údaras na Gaeltachta.

Trails
It is graded as "easy' by the National Trails Office. The trail follows a circular route around the forestry, countryside and coastline surrounding Errigal and passes through the villages of Gweedore, Falcarragh, Derrybeg and Bunbeg. The trail links to two shorter loop walks on Tory Island and Gola Island and there is also a  connecting trail to Slí na Rosann.

It is graded as "moderate" by the National Trails Office. The trail explores the lakes and coastline of The Rosses region of Donegal and takes in the settlements of Burtonport, Annagry, Crolly and Maghery. The trail links to a loop walk around the island of Arranmore and there is also a  link trail from the townland of Crovehy to Slí na Finne, via Doochary.

It is graded as "moderate" by the National Trails Office. The trail loops around the mountains around Lough Finn and the River Finn and passes through the villages of Cloghan and Commeen.

It is graded as "moderate" by the National Trails Office. The route traverses the mountains and coastline of south-west Donegal, an area associated with Saint Colmcille, who gives his name to the trail. It passes through the villages of Kilcar, Carrick and Glencolmcille. Slí Cholmcille is proposed to be included in the Irish leg of the International Appalachian Trail (IAT), an extension of the Appalachian Trail through Canada to Newfoundland, to all terrain the formed part of the Appalachian Mountains on Pangaea, including Ireland.

References

External links
 Slí an Earagail at IrishTrails.ie
 Slí na Rosann at IrishTrails.ie
 Slí an Finne at IrishTrails.ie
 Slí Cholmcille at IrishTrails.ie

Long-distance trails in the Republic of Ireland
Geography of County Donegal
Tourist attractions in County Donegal
Gaeltacht places in County Donegal